Cepolinae is one of two subfamilies of marine ray-finned fish belonging to family Cepolidae, the bandfishes.

Taxonomy
Cepolinae was named by the French polymath Constantine Samuel Rafinesque as the family Cepolidae. It became a subfamily when the genus Owstonia was added to the Cepolidae, having previously been considered a monotypic family Owstonidae, and now considered to be the subfamily Owstoninae. The name, Cepolinae, is derived from the Linnaeus’ 1764 name for the type genus, Cepola and means "little onion", Linnaeus did not explain why he chose this name. It is likely derived from cepollam or cepulam, which in 1686 was said by Francis Willughby to be local names among Roman fishermen for the similar "Fierasfer", a pearlfish, to which Linnaeus believed Cepola macrophthalma was related. As well as this, in 1872 Giovanni Canestrini reported that in Naples the common name for C. macropthalma is Pesce cipolia meaning “onion fish”.

Genera
There are two genera in the subfamily Cepolinae, containing 9 species:

 Acanthocepola Bleeker, 1874
 Cepola Linnaeus, 1764

Characteristics
Cepolinae bandfishes are clearly elongated in shape, more so than Owstonia bandfishes. They have total counts of 48-79 vertebrae and 55-90 soft rays in the dorsal fin. The last soft rays of both the dorsal and anal fins are joined to the caudal fin by a membrane.

Distribution, habitat and biology 
Cepolinae bandfishes are found in the eastern Atlantic, including the Mediterranean Sea, and in the Indian Ocean and the Western Pacific Ocean.  They live over soft bottoms of sand and mud, burrowing into the substrate and feed on zooplankton.

References

Cepolidae
 
Fish subfamilies